Fourth of July on the Plains is the debut album by Lawrence, Kansas-based band, Fourth of July. It was released June 5, 2007 on Range Life Records.

Track listing
 "Be Careful"
 "Can't Sleep"
 "Surfer Dude"
 "Why Did I Drink So Much Last Night?"
 "Long Gone"
 "In Debt"
 "Purple Heart"
 "She's in Love"
 "The Faint"
 "Like a Tiger"
 "Killer Bees"
 "Pimps in Paris"

External links
Fourth of July on MySpace
Range Life Records

2007 debut albums
Fourth of July (band) albums
Range Life Records albums